James Fitzalan Hope, 1st Baron Rankeillour, PC (11 December 1870 – 14 February 1949), was a British Conservative politician. He served as Chairman of Ways and Means from 1921 to 1924 and again from 1924 to 1929.

Background and education
A member of the Hope family now headed by the Marquess of Linlithgow, Hope was the third but only surviving son of J. R. Hope-Scott, of Abbotsford House, and Lady Victoria Alexandrina Fitzalan-Howard, eldest daughter of Henry Fitzalan-Howard, 14th Duke of Norfolk. He was educated at The Oratory School and at Christ Church, Oxford.

Political career
Hope was Conservative Member of Parliament for Sheffield Brightside from 1900 to 1906 and for Sheffield Central from 1908 to 1929. He was appointed a member of the Teachers′ Registration Council in late 1902. Hope served under H. H. Asquith as Treasurer of the Household from 1915 to 1916 and under David Lloyd George as a Lord of the Treasury from 1916 to 1919 and as Parliamentary and Financial Secretary to the Ministry of Munitions from 1919 to 1921, when that office was abolished. He was Chairman of Ways and Means (Deputy-Speaker of the House of Commons) from 1921 until February 1924 and again from December 1924 until 1929, when he fought and lost Walthamstow East. He was sworn of the Privy Council in the 1922 New Year Honours and raised to the peerage as Baron Rankeillour, of Buxted in the County of Sussex, in 1932.

Family
Lord Rankeillour married, firstly, Mabel Helen Riddell, youngest daughter of Francis Henry Riddell, in 1892. They had three sons (two of whom succeeded in turn to the Barony) and one daughter. After his first wife's death in 1938, he married Lady Beatrice Minnie Ponsonby Moore, only daughter of Ponsonby William Moore, 9th Earl of Drogheda, and widow of Struan Robertson Kerr-Clark, in 1941.

He died in February 1949, aged 78, and was succeeded by his eldest son, Arthur.  Lady Rankeillour died in May 1966. Their younger son, Henry John, succeeded his brother to the title and estate in 1958.

References

External links 
 

1870 births
1949 deaths
James
Barons in the Peerage of the United Kingdom
Hope, James
English Roman Catholics
Members of the Privy Council of the United Kingdom
Politicians from Sheffield
Hope, James
Hope, James
Hope, James
Hope, James
Hope, James
Hope, James
Hope, James
Hope, James
Hope, James
UK MPs who were granted peerages
People educated at The Oratory School
Alumni of Christ Church, Oxford
Barons created by George V